Excuse Me is a 2003 Indian Kannada-language romantic drama film starring Sunil Raoh, Ramya and Ajay Rao in the lead roles. The film is directed by Prem of the blockbuster Kariya fame. The music was composed by R. P. Patnaik and was well received upon release.

Plot

Cast

Sunil Raoh as Sunil
Ramya as Madhu
Ajay Rao as Ajay
Sumalatha
Ramakrishna
Ramesh Bhat
Pavitra Lokesh
Sanket Kashi
Kishan Shrikanth
Bullet Prakash
Thulasi Shivamani
Mico Nagaraj
Sanketh Kashi
Navya
Rekha
Ushakiran

Soundtrack

Release 
The film was originally scheduled to release on the second week of November.

Box office 
The film ran for more than two-hundred and twenty days and became a blockbuster. The film ran for almost thiry-five weeks in Kapali Theatre in Bengaluru.

References

External links
 Movie review

2003 films
2000s Kannada-language films
Films set in Bangalore
Indian romantic musical films
2000s romantic musical films
Films directed by Prem